Mahama Awal (born 10 June 1991) is a Cameroonian-born Hong Kong professional footballer who currently plays as a winger for Hong Kong Premier League club Southern.

Club career 
Awal joined China League One club Guangdong Sunray Cave in 2009. On 10 May 2009, he scored his first senior goal in the league match against Liaoning Whowin. He played with Guangdong Sunray Cave for six seasons, scoring 31 goals in 128 league appearances.

Awal transferred to Hong Kong Premier League side South China in January 2015. He made his debut for South China on 11 January against arch rival Kitchee. He scored the game-tying goal in the injury time which gave South China a 2-2 draw with Kitchee.

On 11 June 2017, Pegasus chairperson Canny Leung revealed that Awal along with three other South China players would be jumping ship to Pegasus.

On 8 July 2019, it was confirmed that Awal had left Pegasus after two seasons.

On 13 January 2020, Awal returned to Pegasus. His second stay, however, was cut short due to the 2020 coronavirus pandemic which caused the 2019–20 season to be suspended. On 8 April 2020, Awal agreed to a mutual termination with Pegasus.

On 29 July 2022, Awal joined Southern.

International career
Having continuously played in Hong Kong for more than seven years, Awal is set to earn his Hong Kong passport at the end of March 2023.

On 20 March 2023, Awal officially announced that he had received a Hong Kong passport after giving up his Cameroonian passport, making him eligible to represent Hong Kong internationally.

References

External links

Mahama Awal at HKFA

1991 births
Living people
Naturalized footballers of Hong Kong
Hong Kong footballers
Cameroonian footballers
Hong Kong footballers
Footballers from Douala
Association football forwards
China League One players
Hong Kong Premier League players
Hong Kong First Division League players
Guangdong Sunray Cave players
South China AA players
TSW Pegasus FC players
Southern District FC players
Expatriate footballers in Hong Kong
Expatriate footballers in China
Cameroonian expatriate sportspeople in Hong Kong
Cameroonian expatriate sportspeople in China
Hong Kong League XI representative players